Kelsi Melanie Fairbrother-Svane (born 5 August 1989 in Hillingdon) is a British handball player. She plays for the British national team and competed at the 2012 Summer Olympics in London. She married Kris Svane on 18 July 2013 and now uses Kelsi Fairbrother-Svane as her married name. She played for the club Team Esbjerg until January 2014, when she announced her immediate move to Thuringer HC.

References

External links

Living people
1989 births
People from Hillingdon
British female handball players
British expatriate sportspeople in Denmark
English expatriate sportspeople in Germany
Olympic handball players of Great Britain
Handball players at the 2012 Summer Olympics